Karen's Song is an American sitcom starring Patty Duke that aired on Fox from July 18 to September 12, 1987.

Plot
Forty-year-old divorcee Karen Matthews (Patty Duke) cautiously begins dating 28-year-old Steven Foreman (Lewis Smith). Her daughter Laura (Teri Hatcher) is also a bit apprehensive about her mother's new relationship; however, Karen's friend Claire (Lainie Kazan) encourages her to continue dating the younger man.

Cast
Patty Duke as publishing executive Karen Matthews
Lewis Smith as caterer Steven Foreman
Teri Hatcher as college student Laura Matthews
Lainie Kazan as Claire Steiner

Episodes

Reception
Noel Holston of the Star Tribune said the series is "predictable fare, blandly written and inconsistently cast".

References

External links

1980s American sitcoms
1987 American television series debuts
1987 American television series endings
Fox Broadcasting Company original programming
Television shows set in Los Angeles
English-language television shows
Television series by MGM Television